Trembraze is a hamlet north of Liskeard, Cornwall, England, United Kingdom.

References

Hamlets in Cornwall
Liskeard